Adrián José Gabbarini (born 10 October 1985 in Guaymallén) is an Argentine football goalkeeper who plays for L.D.U. Quito .

Career
Gabbarini played youth football for local clubs in Mendoza Province before joining Independiente in 2006. He served as a reserve goalkeeper for several years without making any first team appearances. He made his breakthrough into the first team coming on as a 72nd-minute substitute in a 2-1 away defeat to Estudiantes de La Plata on 13 September 2009. He served as the regular first team goalkeeper for the remainder of the Apertura 2009 tournament.

International appearances

Honours
Independiente
Copa Sudamericana (1): 2010

LDU Quito
Ecuadorian Serie A: 2018
Copa Ecuador: 2019
Supercopa Ecuador: 2020, 2021

References

External links
 Soccerway profile

1985 births
Living people
Sportspeople from Mendoza Province
Argentine footballers
Association football goalkeepers
Club Atlético Independiente footballers
Newell's Old Boys footballers
Argentinos Juniors footballers
Club Atlético Tigre footballers
Olimpo footballers
L.D.U. Quito footballers
Argentine Primera División players
Argentina international footballers
Ecuadorian Serie A players
Expatriate footballers in Ecuador
Argentine people of Italian descent